Robert Jacquet (6 April 1906 – 7 September 1970) was a French rower. He competed at the 1936 Summer Olympics in Berlin with the men's double sculls where they came fourth.

References

1906 births
1970 deaths
French male rowers
Olympic rowers of France
Rowers at the 1936 Summer Olympics
European Rowing Championships medalists